Nebraska Highway 53 is a highway in southern Nebraska. It has a southern terminus at U.S. 136 east of Gilead, and a northern terminus west of Daykin at Nebraska Highway 4.

Route description
Nebraska Highway 53 begins one mile (1.6 km) east of Gilead at U.S. 136.  It proceeds north through farmland and crosses the Little Blue River before entering Alexandria.  From Alexandria, it continues north until NE 4, where it ends.

History

Highway 53 was originally numbered Highway 76 until January 1, 1975, when it was redesignated to avoid confusion with Interstate 76 (formerly Interstate 80S).

Major intersections

References

External links

Nebraska Roads: NE 41-60

053
Transportation in Thayer County, Nebraska